Grünenbach is a municipality in the district of Lindau in Bavaria in Germany.

Geography 

Grünenbach is located in the Allgäu region.
 
It consists of the following districts: Ebratshofen, Grünenbach.

History 

Before 1800 Grünenbach had been seat of a higher and lower court and belonged to Austria as a part of the Bregenz-Hohenegg authority, before becoming part of Bavaria. Since the signing of the peace treaties of Brünn and Preßburg in 1805 the town belongs to Bavaria. In the course of the administrative reforms in Bavaria the contemporary municipality was formed by the "Gemeindeedikt" of 1818.

Demographics 

In 1970 there were 1,140, in 1987 1,124 and in 2000 1,285 inhabitants living in Grünenbach.

Politics 

The mayor of the town is Markus Eugler (Unabhängige Gemeinderäte).

The revenue from the municipal tax added up to 658,000 € in 1999, of which the net business tax amounted to 206,000 €.

Economy and infrastructure

Economy, agriculture and forestry 

According to the official statistics, in 1998 there were 160 employees who were subject to social insurance contribution in the industrial sector and none in the sector of trade and transport at place of work. In miscellaneous sectors there were 96 persons who were subject to social insurance contribution at place of work. At place of domicile there were 396 employees altogether. In the industrial sector there were two, in the main construction trade four businesses. Moreover, there were 67 agricultural businesses in 1999 with a total area of 1,415 ha.

Education 
In 2005 there were the following institutions:
Kindergartens: 42 kindergarten spaces with 43 children
Elementary school: Laubenbergschule Grünenbach

References 

Lindau (district)